Elliott Aviation is a chain of fixed-base operators (FBOs) representing Beechcraft and Socata products. Headquartered in Moline, Illinois, Elliott Aviation has branches in Moline, IL, Des Moines, Iowa and Minneapolis, Minnesota.

Elliott Aviation has been providing aircraft sales and aviation services since 1936. Elliott Aviation is an authorized service center for the following airframes:
 Hawker 125 Series
 Beechjet/Hawker 400XP
 Premier
 Phenom 100/300
 King Air
 Baron & Bonanza

References

Moline, Illinois
Companies based in Rock Island County, Illinois
Companies based in the Quad Cities
Fixed-base operators